Raynolds Pass, elevation , is a mountain pass on the Montana-Idaho border in the Rocky Mountains, United States.  The pass is on the Continental Divide, and is traversed by a state highway (Idaho State Highway 87 and Montana Highway 87). The pass is named for Captain William F. Raynolds, an early explorer and officer-in-charge of the Raynolds Expedition of the Yellowstone region. The pass is very gentle, with only a slight grade and no major hairpin curves to the highways connections with U.S. Route 287 in Montana and U.S. Route 20 in Idaho.

See also
 Mountain passes in Montana

Notes

Landforms of Fremont County, Idaho
Landforms of Madison County, Montana
Mountain passes of Idaho
Mountain passes of Montana
Great Divide of North America
Transportation in Fremont County, Idaho